César Morales may refer to:
 César Morales (dancer) (born 1978), ballet dancer from Chile
 César Morales (actor) (born 1993), Chilean actor and singer
 César Morales (boxer) (born 1978), Olympic boxer from Mexico
 César Morales (footballer), football player from Mexico